Paul Robert Cherry (born 14 October 1964) is an English former professional footballer who played as a midfielder. Born in England, he played the entirety of his career in Scotland.

Career

Cherry began his career at Hearts in 1983. Three years later, after making only a handful of appearances for the Jambos, he moved to Cowdenbeath. The deal did not involve a cash transaction but witnessed the Blue Brazil relinquish their rights to a future sell-on fee for Craig Levein, whom they had sold to Hearts in 1983.

After making 70 appearances and scoring 13 goals for Cowden, Cherry signed for Alex Totten's St Johnstone. He remained at Muirton Park, firstly, and then McDiarmid Park, for eight years, clocking up over 200 league appearances. He played under two other managers during his time in Perth - John McClelland and Paul Sturrock.

In 1996, Cherry joined Inverness Caledonian Thistle, where he saw out the remainder of his professional career.

He moved into junior football in 1999 with Newburgh.

Post-retirement
Cherry set up the Scottish subsidiary of Stellar Group, a sports management consultancy, with fellow ex-Saint Allan Preston. Stellar Scotland's first major move was assisting in the transfer of John Hartson from Coventry City to Celtic in 2001.

Cherry later formed Independent Financial Services Company, which was based in Perth. The business was sold to Stubbs Insurance Services in 2008.

In 2005, Cherry and his wife Nicola set up the Spanish Estate Agency Chersun, which is based in Murcia, Spain.

References

External links

Profile at londonhearts.com

1964 births
Footballers from Derby
Living people
English footballers
Heart of Midlothian F.C. players
Cowdenbeath F.C. players
Scottish Football League players
St Johnstone F.C. players
Inverness Caledonian Thistle F.C. players
Newburgh F.C. players
Association football midfielders
Association football agents